Lycaena pavana, the white-bordered copper, is a small butterfly found in India that belongs to the lycaenids or blues family.

See also
List of butterflies of India
List of butterflies of India (Lycaenidae)

References
 
  
 
 
 

pavana
Butterflies of Asia
Taxa named by Vincenz Kollar
Butterflies described in 1848